This is a list of notable Bruneians.

List of Bruneian Prominent Royalty

Issue
{| class="wikitable"
|-
! Name !! Birth !!colspan="2"| Marriage !! Their Children
|-
| colspan="5" style="text-align:center;"| Queen Consort Saleha (1965–present)
|-
| rowspan="5" | Princess Rashidah Sa'adatul Bolkiah || rowspan="5" | 26 July 1969 || rowspan="5" colspan="2"| Abdul Rahim Dr. Kemaluddin Al-Haj || Lady Raheemah Sanaul Bolkiah(b. 28 December 1997) 
|-
|  Lady Hariisah Widadul Bolqiah 
|-
|  Lord  'Abdul Raqiib(b. 14 May 2002)
|-
|  Lord  'Abdul Haseeb(b. 14 January 2006)
|-
|  Lady Raqeeqah Raayatul Bolqiah (b. 16 December 2009)
|-
| Princess Muta-Wakkilah Hayatul Bolkiah || 12 October 1971 || colspan="2"| || 
|-
| rowspan="4" | Crown Prince Al-Muhtadee Billah || rowspan="4" | 17 February 1974 || rowspan="4" colspan="2"| Crown Princess Lady Sarah Salleh Ab-Rahaman || Prince Abdul Muntaqim(b. 17 March 2007)
|-
| Princess Muneerah Madhul Bolkiah (b. 2 January 2011)
|-
| Prince Muhammad Aiman(b. 7 June 2015)   
|-
| Princess Faathimah Az-Zahraa Raihaanul Bolkiah(b. 1 December 2017)
|-

| rowspan="2" | Majeedah Nuurul Bolkiah || rowspan="2" | 16 March 1976 || rowspan="2" colspan="2"| Khairul Khalil Syed Haji Jaafari|| Lord  'Abdul Hafeez(b. 18 March 2008)
|-
| Lady Raihaanah Hanaa-Ul Bolqiah(b. 6 January 2010)
|-
| rowspan="3" | Princess Hafizah Sururul Bolkiah || rowspan="3" | 12 March 1980 || rowspan="3" colspan="2"| Mohammad Ruzaini Dr. Haji Mohammad Yakub|| Lord Muhammad Za'eem(b. 3 August 2013)
|-
| Lord Muhammad 'Aamir(b. 13 February 2015)
|-
| Lord  'Abdul Hakeem(b.19 February 2018)
|-
| rowspan="2" | Prince Abdul Malik || rowspan="2" | 30 June 1983 || rowspan="2" colspan="2" | Raabiatul Adawiyyah binti Bolkiah || Lady ’Muthee'ah Raayatul Bolqiah(b. 2 March 2016)
|-
| Lady Fathiyyah Rafaahul Bolqiah(b.10 March 2018)
|-
| colspan="6" style="text-align:center;"| Lady Mariam (1982–2003) Divorced
|-
| Prince Abdul Azim || 29 July 1982 || colspan="2" | || colspan="2"|
|-
| Princess Azemah  Ni'matul Bolkiah || 26 September 1984 || colspan="2" | || colspan="2"|
|-
| Princess Fadzillah Lubabul Bolkiah || 23 August 1985 || colspan="2" | || colspan="2"|
|-
| Prince Abdul Mateen || 10 August 1991 || colspan="2" | || colspan="2"|
|-
| colspan="6" style="text-align:center;"| Azrinaz Mazhar (2005–2010) Divorced 
|-
| Prince Abdul Wakeel || 1 June 2006 || colspan="2"| || colspan="2"|
|-
| Princess Ameerah Wardatul Bolkiah''' || 28 January 2008 || colspan="2" | || colspan="2"|
|}

He also has 15 grandchildren.

Bruneian Celebrities
 Eqah, singer
 Hill Zaini, actor and singer-songwriter
 Maria (Meria Aires), singer-songwriter
 Wu Chun, actor and member of Taiwanese boyband Fahrenheit''
 Zul F, actor and singer-songwriter

Other
 Sharifah Czarena, first woman from Brunei to Captain a commercial airliner
 Datin Seri Setia Marianne Elisabeth Lloyd-Dolbey, personal secretary to Sultan Omar Ali Saifuddien III
 Cornelius Sim, Cardinal of Brunei

References

Lists of Bruneian people